Izbornyk is an internet-library project of the old Ukrainian literature also known as "History of Ukraine 9-18th centuries. Primary sources and interpretation". It functions since the 21st of August 2001.

The project is a collection of major works on history of Ruthenia, Cossack Hetmanate and Ukraine.

The project covers the following main subjects: Chronicles, Linguistics, History, Old Ukrainian Literature, Taras Shevchenko, Political Science, Literary Studies, Grammar and lexicons, Historical maps.

2016, according to website visit statistics, there are from 200,000 to 500,000 visitors per month.

Idea 
A library is a collection of ebooks and texts, combined with a declared theme and a single idea. The idea behind the project is to strive to collect as many works of Ukrainian writing as possible, not simply as a random collection of texts from different times and authors, but against the backdrop of a holistic cultural and historical process, which would make it clear the unity, heredity and identity of Ukrainian literature, despite obvious gaps in the linguistic code and  breaks in tradition. This is the background of the annals, chronicles and historical documents collected in the main section of the page — Chronicles.

Selected works
 History of Ruthenians
 Hypatian Codex
 Laurentian Codex
 Primary Chronicle
 Galician–Volhynian Chronicle

External links
 Official website

References

Ukrainian studies
History websites
Ukrainian-language websites
Ukrainian online encyclopedias
Area studies encyclopedias